Jacob Arnie Cutrera is a former American football linebacker who played in the National Football League. He was signed by the Jacksonville Jaguars as an undrafted free agent in 2010. He played college football at Louisiana State.

Professional career

Jacksonville Jaguars
Cutrera was signed as an undrafted free agent by the Jacksonville Jaguars after the 2010 NFL Draft. Cutrera and two other undrafted free agents made the Jaguars' opening day roster.

Tampa Bay Buccaneers
On October 11, 2011, he was signed off the Jaguars' practice squad by the Tampa Bay Buccaneers. He was released by the Buccaneers on August 27, 2013.

Personal life
He resides in Lafayette, Louisiana. He attended Acadiana High School in Lafayette, Louisiana.

References

External links
 Tampa Bay Buccaneers bio
 Jacksonville Jaguars bio
LSU Tigers bio

1988 births
Living people
Sportspeople from Lafayette, Louisiana
Players of American football from Louisiana
American football middle linebackers
LSU Tigers football players
Jacksonville Jaguars players
Tampa Bay Buccaneers players